The 2016 Citi Open was a tennis tournament played on outdoor hard courts. It was the 48th edition (for the men) and the 6th edition (for the women) of the Washington Open. The event was part of the ATP World Tour 500 series of the 2016 ATP World Tour, and of the WTA International tournaments of the 2016 WTA Tour. It took place at the William H.G. FitzGerald Tennis Center in Washington, D.C., United States, from July 18 to July 24, 2016.

Points and prize money

Point distribution

Prize money 

1 Qualifiers prize money is also the Round of 64 prize money
* per team

ATP singles main-draw entrants

Seeds

1 Rankings are as of July 11, 2016

Other entrants
The following players received wild cards into the main singles draw:
  Reilly Opelka 
  Denis Shapovalov 
  Frances Tiafoe 
  Alexander Zverev

The following player received entry using a protected ranking into the main draw: 
  Brian Baker

The following players received entry from the singles qualifying draw:
  James Duckworth
  Jared Donaldson
  Ernesto Escobedo
  Ryan Harrison
  Alex Kuznetsov  
  Vincent Millot

Withdrawals
Before the tournament
  Ričardas Berankis →replaced by  Bjorn Fratangelo 
  Tomáš Berdych →replaced by  Yūichi Sugita
  Ernests Gulbis →replaced by  Sam Groth
  Juan Martín del Potro →replaced by  Benjamin Becker
  Nick Kyrgios →replaced by  Yoshihito Nishioka
  Rajeev Ram →replaced by  Lukáš Lacko

Retirements
  Ivan Dodig

ATP doubles main-draw entrants

Seeds

1 Rankings are as of July 11, 2016

Other entrants
The following pairs received wildcards into the doubles main draw:
  Taylor Fritz  /  Reilly Opelka
  Denis Kudla  /  Frances Tiafoe

The following pair received entry from the doubles qualifying draw:
  Brian Baker /  Austin Krajicek

Retirements
  Treat Huey

WTA singles main-draw entrants

Seeds

1 Rankings are as of July 11, 2016

Other entrants
The following players received wild cards into the main singles draw:
  Françoise Abanda 
  Usue Maitane Arconada 
  Samantha Crawford 
  Jessica Pegula

The following players received entry using a protected ranking into the main draw:
  Vania King
  Aleksandra Wozniak

The following players received entry from the qualifying draw:
  Lauren Albanese 
  Varvara Flink
  Alla Kudryavtseva
  Zhu Lin

The following player received entry as a lucky loser:
  Hiroko Kuwata

Withdrawals
Before the tournament
  Louisa Chirico → replaced by  Tamira Paszek
  Margarita Gasparyan → replaced by  Risa Ozaki
  Vania King (change of schedule) → replaced by  Hiroko Kuwata
  Mirjana Lučić-Baroni → replaced by  Aleksandra Wozniak
  Wang Qiang → replaced by  Kristína Kučová
  Heather Watson → replaced by  Lauren Davis

During the tournament
  Tamira Paszek (Upper respiratory illness)

Retirements
  Caroline Wozniacki (Back injury)

WTA doubles main-draw entrants

Seeds

1 Rankings are as of July 11, 2016

Other entrants
The following pair received a wildcard into the doubles main draw:
  Malkia Menguene /  Nidhi Surapaneni

Withdrawals
Before the tournament
  Françoise Abanda (Right finger injury)

Retirements
  Kristína Kučová (Back injury)

Champions

Men's singles

  Gaël Monfils def.  Ivo Karlović, 5–7, 7–6(8–6), 6–4

Women's singles

  Yanina Wickmayer def.  Lauren Davis, 6–4, 6–2

Men's doubles

  Daniel Nestor /  Édouard Roger-Vasselin def.  Łukasz Kubot /  Alexander Peya, 7–6(7–3), 7–6(7–4)

Women's doubles

  Monica Niculescu /  Yanina Wickmayer def.  Shuko Aoyama /  Risa Ozaki, 6–4, 6–3

References

External links
Official website

Citi Open
Washington Open (tennis)
Citi
Howard Washington, D.C.